Black Dog Halt is a former railway station on the Chippenham and Calne line in Wiltshire, England. Originally created in 1863 as a private stop for Lord Lansdowne of Bowood House, it became a public request stop after the formation of British Rail. The halt was closed and demolished in 1965, and today it is part of National Cycle Route 403.

History
Black Dog Halt was opened on 3 November 1863 by the Calne Railway company. Lord Lansdowne of Bowood House used the halt as a private station; use by the public was allowed, though it was not common knowledge. Lord Lansdowne had a special compartment in one of the Calne line's autocoaches. Later he was persuaded to allow the halt to be named on the timetable.

The Calne Railway company was sold to the Great Western Railway in 1892. After the formation of British Rail the halt was turned into a request stop.

In 1965 the halt was closed and soon the buildings were demolished. The tracks were lifted in 1967.

Today the site of the halt is being used as part of National Cycle Route 403 which runs from Chippenham to Calne. The former route of the track is also a popular route for walkers. It is possible to walk to both Calne and Bowood House from here.

References

External links

 Black Dog Halt at a website dedicated to disused railway stations
 Black Dog Halt station on navigable 1948 O. S. map
 Black Dog Halt station at Subterranea Britannica
 Exploring Bowood Park at the AA website 
 Black Dog Halt at The Ramblers website

Disused railway stations in Wiltshire
Railway stations in Great Britain opened in 1863
Railway stations in Great Britain closed in 1965
Beeching closures in England
Former Great Western Railway stations